Below is a list of commercial banks in Ghana, as of March 2020.

Banks 
 Absa Bank Ghana Limited
 Access Bank Ghana Plc
 Agricultural Development Bank of Ghana
 Bank of Africa Ghana Limited
 CalBank Limited
 Consolidated Bank Ghana Limited
 Ecobank Ghana Limited
 FBN Bank Ghana Limited
 Fidelity Bank Ghana Limited
 First Atlantic Bank Limited
 First National Bank Ghana
 GCB Bank Limited
 Guaranty Trust Bank Ghana Limited
 National Investment Bank Limited
 OmniBSIC Bank Ghana Limited
 Prudential Bank Limited
 Republic Bank Ghana Limited
 Société Générale Ghana Limited
 Stanbic Bank Ghana Limited
 Standard Chartered Bank Ghana Limited
 United Bank for Africa Ghana Limited
 Universal Merchant Bank Limited
 Zenith Bank Ghana Limited.

Banks with representative offices only
These banks maintain only representative offices in Ghana.

 Citibank
 Exim Bank of Korea
 Ghana International Bank Plc

Other banks
Below is a list of other banks in Ghana as at June 2022.

 ARB Apex Bank Limited
 Development Bank of Ghana

See also 
 List of banks in Africa
 Economy of Ghana
 Bank of Ghana

References

External links 
 Website of Bank of Ghana
 Changing Profiles of Ghanaian Commercial Banks As of 6 December 2011.

 
Banks
Ghana
Ghana